William Snelgrove Finn (born November 1, 1958) is an American animator, voice actor, storyboard artist, and director.

Career
His work in animation includes characters from Disney, Warner Bros., DreamWorks, and Don Bluth films such as The Secret of NIMH, Oliver & Company, The Little Mermaid, The Rescuers Down Under, and Pocahontas. Finn animated such characters as Cogsworth in Beauty and the Beast, Iago in Aladdin, and Laverne in The Hunchback of Notre Dame. Finn wrote and directed Home on the Range and voiced the character of Hollywood Fish in Chicken Little. In 2006, Finn directed the computer animated short Hammy's Boomerang Adventure, a spin-off of Over the Hedge.

Filmography

Awards
 In 2005, Finn received a nomination with John Sanford for Directing in an Animated Feature Production Annie Award for Home on the Range.
 In 2013, Finn received a nomination with Daniel St. Pierre for Best Feature Cristal Award at the Annecy International Animated Film Festival for Legends of Oz: Dorothy's Return

References

External links

Will Finn's blog
Will Finn at IMDb

Living people
Animators from New York (state)
American male voice actors
Place of birth missing (living people)
American storyboard artists
American animated film directors
Walt Disney Animation Studios people
DreamWorks Animation people
1958 births